A list of notable photographers from Greece:
Filippos Margaritis (1839–1892)
Leonidas Papazoglou (1872–1918, Λεωνίδας Παπάζογλου)
Nelly's, Elli Souyioultzoglou-Seraïdari (1889–1998, Έλλη Σουγιουλτζόγλου-Σεραϊδάρη)
Yiorgos Depollas (born 1947)
Mary Kay (landscape photographer)
Yannis Kontos (born 1971)
Vassilis Makris (born 1958)
John Stathatos (born 1947)
Dimitris Yeros (born 1948)
Nikos Economopoulos (born 1953, Νίκος Οικονομόπουλος, Nikos Oikonomopoulos)
Vassilis Makris (born 1958, Βασίλης Μακρής)
Ianna Andreadis (born 1960)
Tzeli Hadjidimitriou (born 1962, Jelly Hadjidimitriou, Τζέλη Χατζηδημητρίου)
Johan Lolos (born 1987)

See also 
 History of Greek photography

Photography in Greece
Greek photographers
Photographers
Greek